Daphne Lee Ashbrook (born January 30, 1963) is an American actress best known for playing Grace Holloway in Doctor Who: The Movie, Melora Pazlar in Star Trek: Deep Space Nine,  Jackie Kowalski in Hollywood Heights, and Dawn Atwood in The OC.

Early years

The daughter of actor/director Buddy Ashbrook and actress D'Ann Paton, Ashbrook was raised in San Diego County, California. Her siblings are actor Dana Ashbrook and actor/director Taylor Ashbrook. She made her acting debut at age six.

Career 
Ashbrook gained early acting experience on stage in the Los Angeles area. Productions in which she appeared included Burlesque ... The Way You Like It (1982), Come Blow Your Horn (1983), and The Coming of Stork (1984).

Ashbrook played Liz McKay in the ABC crime drama Our Family Honor (1985-1986), Kathy Davenport on the ABC crime drama Fortune Dane (1986) and Alex in the ABC comedy-drama Hooperman (1987-1989). In 1990, she appeared as Phyllis Gates, Rock Hudson's wife, in the television film Rock Hudson.

In 1984 she appeared in the TV series Knight Rider, in the episode "A Knight in Shining Armor", starring as Katherine Granger.

Ashbrook played the titular character in "Melora", a 1993 episode of Star Trek: Deep Space Nine.

She played Grace Holloway in the 1996 television film Doctor Who—a portrayal that upset some fans because she was the first character to romantically kiss the Doctor.

A 2004 trip to the United Kingdom was filmed for the 2005 documentary Daphne Ashbrook in the UK. This DVD documentary followed her work with Doctor Who, including her role as Perfection in the Big Finish Productions audio play The Next Life.

In 2006, Ashbrook played Charlotte Howell in the audio drama Dark Shadows: The Book of Temptation. She was featured in extensive interviews on the Doctor Who podcasts Doctor Who: DWO Whocast, and Doctor Who: Podshock as well as in other podcasts including "The Happiness Patrol".

Other television work includes Cold Case, CSI, Crossing Jordan, JAG, Murder, She Wrote, Judging Amy and Intruders. She had a recurring role on The O.C.. Other appearances include the film The Lodger (2009), and episodes of NCIS, Ghost Whisperer, Without a Trace, and Fame. In 2012 she starred as Jackie in the Nickelodeon night time soap Hollywood Heights.

In 2012, Ashbrook released a memoir Dead Woman Laughing (An actor's take from both sides of the camera). It details her life as an actor and her experience growing up in an acting family.

Personal life 

On September 6, 1988, Ashbrook and her then-partner, Lorenzo Lamas had a daughter, Paton Lee.

Filmography

Film

Television

References

External links
 
 
 
 

Living people
American television actresses
American film actresses
Actresses from California
People from San Diego
20th-century American actresses
21st-century American actresses
1963 births